Little Falls Branch, a  tributary stream of the Potomac River, is located in Montgomery County, Maryland. In the 19th century, the stream was also called Powder Mill Branch. It drains portions of Bethesda, Somerset, Friendship Heights, and the District of Columbia, flows under the Chesapeake and Ohio Canal (C&O), and empties into the Potomac at Little Falls rapids, which marks the upper end of the tidal Potomac.

Course
The stream rises on the grounds of the Chevy Chase Country Club and flows through Chevy Chase to the Somerset neighborhood, where it crosses through Vinton Park and the Willard Avenue Park. After crossing under the Little Falls Parkway it joins Willett Branch and then flows through the Little Falls Stream Valley Park to Brookmont, the C&O Canal and into the Potomac River.

History
In the mid-19th century, the stream served as an interim water source for Washington, D.C.  The Dalecarlia Reservoir was built on the D.C.-Maryland border next to Little Falls Branch. A dam was built on the stream, and water was diverted into the reservoir starting in 1859. In 1864, with the completion of the Washington Aqueduct, the Potomac River became the city's principal water source. However, muddy water from Little Falls Branch continued to flow into the reservoir, and a bypass pipe was built to channel the aqueduct water to another city reservoir, the Georgetown Reservoir. In 1895 construction was completed to fully divert the stream from the Dalecarlia Reservoir.

In the 1920s Montgomery County Government purchased the stream valley south of the confluence with Willett Branch and much of the Willett Branch stream valley south of Bradley Boulevard for the purpose of building a parkway. The Little Falls Parkway was eventually built from Glenbrook Road to Massachusetts Avenue, but plans to extend the parkway south to MacArthur Boulevard were dropped in 1970 and the southern section became Little Falls Stream Valley Park. In 1978, the National Capital Planning Commission approved the idea of a trail, which prompted neighbors to go to court with a protest. When the trail design was approved from Bradley Boulevard to Albemarle Street, the neighborhood group sued again. In 1980, after a contentious battle with neighbors in the Westmoreland Woods neighborhood, a sewer line was built through the Park and a bike trail added on top of it. The bike trail was originally planned to follow the Parkway to Bradley with a spur following Willett Branch to Hillandale Road and that road to a different point on Bradley, but the entire trail was never built. Instead the 3.5-mile Little Falls hiker-biker paved trail is on road on the Little Falls Parkway between Massachusetts and Dorset. North of Dorset it follows Willett Branch north to Hillandale and east to Norwood Drive. In Little Falls Stream Valley the trail is next to the Capital Crescent Trail.

Current conditions
Today Little Falls Branch flows through a highly urbanized area, and parts of the stream have been altered through construction of underground pipes, culverts and open concrete channels. The stream runs near the Dalecarlia drinking water treatment plant in Washington, D.C. and occasionally has received overflow discharges from the plant.

According to a study conducted by the county government, the water quality of the stream and its tributaries is poor, due to water pollution from urban runoff, as well as the channelization described above. The county and the Town of Somerset have installed several stream restoration projects throughout the watershed.

Tributaries of Little Falls Branch
Dalecarlia Tributary
Little Falls Mall Tributary
Spring Valley Tributary
Willet Branch

See also
List of Maryland rivers

References

External links
Little Falls Watershed Alliance

Rivers of Montgomery County, Maryland
Tributaries of the Potomac River
Rivers of Maryland